The Klerf Formation is an Early Devonian (Emsian) formation that includes a Lagerstätte in the Northern Eifel hills, at Willwerath near Prüm, Rhineland-Palatinate, Germany. In it Jaekelopterus rhenaniae, a giant eurypterid was discovered.

Depositional environment 
The siltstone and sandstone formation was deposited in an estuarine to deltaic environment. This was located on the edge of Avalonia bordering the Proto-Tethys Ocean.

Fossil content 

Apart from the largest arthropod, Jaekelopterus (shown on the left), found in the formation, it also preserved the fish, bryozoa, brachiopod and ostracod remains, the arachnids Devonotarbus hombachensis, Xenarachne willwerathensis, and Mutationella indet. and flora.

See also 
 List of fossiliferous stratigraphic units in Europe
 Geology of Germany
 Floresta Formation
 Old Port Formation

References 

Geologic formations of Germany
Devonian Germany
Devonian System of Europe
Devonian southern paleotemperate deposits
Emsian Stage
Siltstone formations
Shale formations
Sandstone formations
Deltaic deposits